Lebedev against Lebedev is a 1965 Soviet drama film directed by Genrikh Gabay.

Plot 
The film tells about a modest and naive man who wants to overcome his shortcomings and become a strong man.

Cast 
 Aleksey Eybozhenko
 Vladimir Retsepter
 Lev Durov
 Viktor Uralskiy
 Sergey Balatev
 Leonid Bronevoy
 G. Burmistrov
 Mikhail Derzhavin

References

External links 
 

1965 films
1960s Russian-language films
Soviet drama films
1965 drama films